Hodges Stadium is a multi-purpose stadium at the University of North Florida (UNF), and the home field for the North Florida Ospreys soccer, track and field, and cross country teams. It is located on the university's campus in Jacksonville, Florida, U.S. It is named for George and Kernan Hodges, who donated $2 million to upgrade the facility in 2006.

The 12,000-capacity stadium opened in 2004 with s capacity of 9,400 and underwent renovations in 2006 and 2008 that installed additional seating, a press box, and a 9-lane Olympic quality running track. The facility additionally includes classrooms, offices, and the Browning Athletic Training and Education Center. Following the completion of the current track, it became one of seven facilities in the U.S. certified by the International Association of Athletics Federations (IAAF), allowing it to host all NCAA and IAAF events within its grounds. In addition to its use by UNF the stadium has become a center for rugby league football, serving as home field for the Jacksonville Axemen of the USA Rugby League (USARL), and hosting several international matches and training camps.

History
The University of North Florida's field was first opened in 2004 in order to serve the North Florida Ospreys men's and women's soccer, cross country running, and track and field teams. In 2006 Jacksonville philanthropists George and Kernan Hodges issued a $2 million donation to UNF to improve the facility. The donation funded the construction of seats for 10,000, an eight-lane 400-meter track, a press box, lighting, and classrooms and offices. The nameless field was renamed Hodges Stadium after them. Other additions included the Browning Athletic Training and Education Center and a strength and conditioning center.

In 2008 the stadium underwent another renovation to install a new state-of-the art running track. The university spent another $3 million to complete the 9-lane Olympic-quality track. It was designed by the Italian company Mondo and was the third facility in the world to feature the company's Mondotrack SX rubber surface. It was built to meet National Collegiate Athletic Association (NCAA) and International Association of Athletics Federations (IAAF) standards, and is one of only seven facilities in the U.S. to be certified by the IAAF.

Notable events
The stadium has held several international rugby league football matches and has hosted training camps for international teams. Academy Award-winning actor Russell Crowe visited UNF to organize for a club rugby league match to be played at Hodges Stadium. Crowe's South Sydney Rabbitohs played against the Leeds Rhinos on January 26, 2008, with 12,500 people in attendance. In 2009, the Leeds Rhinos returned to UNF to play the Salford City Reds in an exhibition game.

February 2005 - Practice for the Philadelphia Eagles before Super Bowl XXXIX.
April 2009 - UNF Rugby Football Club hosted their annual Alumni Game for the first time in the stadium.
2009 Atlantic Sun Conference Track and Field Championships 
December 19, 2009 - North America Bowl between Jacksonville Knights and Team Canada a traveling all-star team.
July 23–26, 2015 - Hosted the USATF Masters Outdoor Track & Field Championships.
July 27–August 2, 2015 - Hosted the USATF National Junior Olympic Track & Field Championships.

Rugby League Matches

Updated 24 April 2021

External links
 Official Website

References

Soccer venues in Florida
University of North Florida
Sports venues in Jacksonville, Florida
Multi-purpose stadiums in the United States
Rugby league stadiums in the United States
Rugby league in Florida
Southside, Jacksonville
2004 establishments in Florida
Sports venues completed in 2004
North American Soccer League stadiums
College soccer venues in the United States
College track and field venues in the United States
Athletics (track and field) venues in Florida
National Premier Soccer League stadiums